All Saints Episcopal School is an independent, private school in Lubbock, Texas. With approximately 450 students, the school serves children from age three through high school. All Saints nurtures growth in its students with focus in the areas of academics, fine arts, athletics, spiritual growth and community service.

Notable alumni

 Madisyn Cox
 Sean O'Hair
 Spencer Wells

References

External links
 

Educational institutions established in 1956
Private K-12 schools in Texas
Episcopal schools in the United States
High schools in Lubbock, Texas
1956 establishments in Texas